Wuhe is a town under the administration of Jingyuan County, Gansu, China. , it has 14 villages under its administration:
Yangsi Village
Liuzhaike Village
Tianwo Village
Yemalao Village
Jiazhaike Village
Baicilin Village
Erdaoqu Village
Baita Village
Zhuzhaike Village
Banwei Village
Baiyahe Village
Shangshutang Village
Xujuan Village
Dawan Village

References 

Township-level divisions of Gansu
Jingyuan County, Gansu